The Celje Water Tower is a well-preserved part of the town walls of Celje, Slovenia. It was built as a corner tower after 1451 and redesigned in the 16th century. Since 2010, it has been protected as a cultural monument of local significance.

References

External links

Buildings and structures in Celje
Stone buildings
Water towers in Slovenia
Towers completed in the 15th century